Charlotte Bonin (born 10 February 1987 in Aosta) is an Italian professional triathlete.

Career
Charlotte Bonin was the national duathlon champion of the year 2006, the national triathlon silver medalist of the years 2007 and 2010, and the triathlon gold medalist of the year 2008.
In Italy, Charlotte Bonin represents the Gruppo Sportivo Fiamme Gialle, which, technically speaking, is part of the Polizia Penitenziaria.

In 2010, Bonin also represented the elite team of Tri Club Nantais in the prestigious Club Championship Series Lyonnaise des Eaux. At Dunkirk on 23 May 2010, Bonin placed 33rd and was among the three best runners of her club, the triathlètes classants l'equipe; actually, none of the four elite triathletes of Tri Club Nantais was French: Anna Maria Mazzetti placed 7th, Maria Pujol Perez 21st, Charlotte Bonin 33rd and Scarlet Vatlach 42nd. At her second and last Lyonnaise triathlon of this season in Beauvais (13 June 2010) Bonin placed 17th and thus proved to be the best of her club. At Beauvais (13 June 2010) Bonin placed 17th and was the best of her club, Margie Santimaria was the second best of Tri Club Nantais.

In 2011, Charlotte Bonin will also represent the elite club EJOT in the German Bundesliga circuit.

ITU Competitions 
In the eight years from 2003 to 2010 Bonin took part in 44 ITU competitions and achieved 14 top ten positions. At the first race of the season 2011 in La Paz Bonin could win the gold medal.
The following list is based upon the official ITU rankings and the Athlete's Profile Page. Unless indicated otherwise, all events are triathlons (Olympic Distance) and belong to the Elite category.

BG = the sponsor British Gas · DNF = did not finish · DNS = did not start

References

External links
 

Italian female triathletes
1987 births
Living people
People from Aosta
Triathletes at the 2008 Summer Olympics
Triathletes at the 2016 Summer Olympics
Triathletes of Fiamme Azzurre
Olympic triathletes of Italy
Sportspeople from Aosta Valley
21st-century Italian women